"Begging to You" is a song written and recorded by American country music artist Marty Robbins.  It was released in October 1963.  The song was Robbins' tenth number one on the country chart.  The song spent three weeks at the top spot and a total of twenty-three weeks on the charts.

Chart performance

References

1963 singles
Marty Robbins songs
Songs written by Marty Robbins
Columbia Records singles
1963 songs